Mount Zion High School is a public high school, part of the Carroll County School System, located west of Carrollton, Georgia, United States and serving the community of Mount Zion, Georgia. The school's mascot is the Eagle.

References

Public high schools in Georgia (U.S. state)
Schools in Carroll County, Georgia